ŻKS ROW Rybnik, also known as ROW Rybnik, is a Polish motorcycle speedway team based in Rybnik, which currently competes in 1. Liga. Rybnik is one of the oldest and most successful teams in Polish speedway having won the league championship on twelve occasions. ROW is one of the several clubs of the once united ROW Rybnik multi-sports club.

History

1948 to 1959 
Speedway in Rybnik has existed since 1930. The club competed in the inaugural 1948 Polish speedway season, under the name of RKM Budowlani (builders) Rybnik. They won the silver medal during the 1950 Polish speedway season. As Górnik Rybnik the team won three consecutive titles in 1956, 1957 and 1958. The team included riders such as Stanisław Tkocz and Joachim Maj,  who was Polish champion in 1958

1960 to 1969
The 1960s was not only the most successful for the club but the most successful decade of all time for any club. As Górnik Rybnik they earned a silver in 1961 and then embarked on seven consecutive gold medal wins in 1962, 1963, 1964, 1965, 1966, 1967 and 1968. Four of these wins were achieved under the new name ROW Rybnik because in 1964, the multi-sports club ROW Rybnik was formed as a result of a merger between two local clubs RKS Górnik Rybnik and KS Górnik Chwałowice. Furthermore three of the club's riders won the five Polish Championships; Andrzej Wyglenda (1964, 1968 and 1969), Stanisław Tkocz (1965) and Antoni Woryna (1966).

1970 to 1989

The 1970s was much less emphatic but the club still managed to win the their 11th and 12th gold medal wins in 1970 and 1972. Jerzy Gryt won the 1971 Polish Championship and Andrzej Wyglenda won his second in 1973.

The 1980s resulted in a gradual decline and the team suffered relegation in 1982 but by the end of the decade they had recovered to win a silver and a bronze medal in 1988 and 1989 respectively.

1990 to 1999
After a silver medal win in 1990 the club underwent a name change to Rybnicki Klub Motorowy (Rybnik's Motorcycle Club) in 1994. The remainder of the decade saw very few highlights.

2000 to 2009 
When the Ekstraliga was introduced in 2000, Rybnik were in the 1. Liga. They won the 1. Liga in 2003. In 2009, they reverted to the historical "ROW" prefix as RKM ROW Rybnik.

2010 to present
In 2013, they changed name again, to ŻKS ROW Rybnik, the same season they won 2. Liga. In 2019, they gained promotion back to the Ekstraliga but were relegated the following season (2020) and have struggled since.

2023 Squad 
Seniors:
 Brady Kurtz
 Patrick Hansen 
 Jan Kvěch
 Krystian Pieszczek 
Under-24:
 Patryk Wojdyło
Under-21 juniors:
 Kacper Tkocz
 Lech Chlebowski
 Paweł Wyczyszczok
 Seweryn Grabarczyk
 Szymon Tomaszewski
 Kamil Winkler
Team Manager:
 Antoni Skupień

Previous teams

2009 squad

Seniors:
 Zbigniew Czerwinski
 Ronnie Jamrozy
 Adam Pawliczek
 Marcin Rempala
 Mariusz Wegrzyk
 Kyle Legault
 Denis Gizatullin
 Ricky Kling

Under-21 juniors:
 Mateusz Chochlinski
 Kamil Fleger
 Rafal Fleger
 Piotr Korbel
 Michal Mitko
 Lukasz Piecha
 Slawomir Pyszny
 Bartosz Szymura

Team Manager:
 Adam Pawliczek

2010 Squad

Seniors:
 Ronnie Jamrozy
 Mariusz Wegrzyk
 Nicolai Klindt
 Joonas Kylmaekorpi
 Daniel Nermark
 Andriej Karpov

Under-21 juniors:
 Mateusz Chochlinski
 Mateusz Domanski
 Rafal Fleger
 Kamil Fleger
 Lukasz Piecha
 Slawomir Pyszny
 Bartosz Szymura

Team Manager:
 Dariusz Momot

2011 Squad

Seniors:
 Daniel Pytel
 Andriej Karpov
 Roman Chromik
 Antonio Lindbaeck
 Ronnie Jamrozy
 Jesper B. Monberg
 Rory Schlein
 Adam Pawliczek
Under-21 juniors:
 Aleksandr Loktaev
 Volodymir Tejgal
 Mateusz Domanski
 Kamil Fleger
 Lukasz Piecha
Team Manager:
 Adam Pawliczek

2012 Squad

Seniors: (Average points per: ¦ heat ¦ meeting ¦)
 Oliver Allen ¦ 2,115 ¦ 9,82 ¦
 Roman Chromik ¦ 1,988 ¦ 9,81 ¦
 Jacek Rempała ¦ 1,714 ¦ 7,77 ¦ 
 Mariusz Firlej ¦ 1,549 ¦ 6,64 ¦
 Adrian Szewczykowski ¦ 1,444 ¦ 5,79 ¦
 Jason Doyle ¦ 2,200 ¦ 10,00 ¦
 Pontus Aspgren ¦ 1,810 ¦ 6,80 ¦
 Kenni Larsen
 Aleksiej Charczenko ¦ 1,321 ¦ 6,00 ¦
 Linus Ekloef
 Patryk Pawlaszczyk ¦ 1,733 ¦ 7,00 ¦
 Bartosz Szymura ¦ 1,417 ¦ 4,67 ¦
 Marcin Bubel ¦ 1,067 ¦ 2,60 ¦
Under-21 juniors: (Average points per: ¦ heat ¦ meeting ¦)
 Łukasz Piecha ¦ 0,706 ¦ 2,00 ¦
 Mikkel Bech Jensen ¦ 1,955 ¦ 9,50 ¦
 Marc Randrup ¦ 0,286 ¦ 1,00 ¦
 Matthias Thoernblom ¦ 1,575 ¦ 7,13 ¦
 Mateusz Domanski ¦ 0,500 ¦ 1,00 ¦
Team Manager:
 Maciej Simionkowski

2013 Squad

Team: (Average points per: ¦ heat ¦ meeting ¦)
 Roman Chromik ¦ 1,923 ¦ 7,86 ¦
 Michal Mitko ¦ 1,810 ¦ 7,31 ¦
 Lewis Bridger ¦ 2,258 ¦ 10,77 ¦
 Ilja Czalov ¦ 2,346 ¦ 10,82 ¦
 Vaclav Milik ¦ 2,171 ¦ 10,14 ¦
 Christian Hefenbrock
 Viktor Kulakov ¦ 1,455 ¦ 5,38 ¦
 Sam Masters
 Lukasz Bojarski ¦ 1,750 ¦ 6,00 ¦
 Slawomir Pyszny ¦ 0,000 ¦ 0,00 ¦
 Zbigniew Czerwinski
 Marcel Kajzer ¦ 1,833 ¦ 4,00 ¦
 Remigiusz Perzyński ¦ 0,000 ¦ 0,00 ¦
 Bartosz Szymura ¦ 0,000 ¦ 0,00 ¦
 Mike Trzensiok ¦ 1,300 ¦ 4,00 ¦
 Marcin Bubel ¦ 1,875 ¦ 6,50 ¦
 Lukasz Witoszek
 Patryk Malitowski ¦ 1,267 ¦ 4,25 ¦
 Alex Zgardziński ¦ 1,700	¦ 5,00 ¦
 Kacper Woryna ¦ 1,469 ¦ 4,21 ¦
Team Manager:
 Jan Grabowski

2014 Squad

Seniors: (Average points per: ¦ heat ¦ meeting ¦)
 Rafal Szombierski ¦ 1,760 ¦ 5,29 ¦
 Roman Chromik ¦ 0,000 ¦ 0,00 ¦
 Chris Harris ¦ 1,605 ¦ 6,50 ¦
 Dakota North ¦ 1,804 ¦ 8,44 ¦
 Ilja Czalov ¦ 1,489 ¦ 6,89 ¦
 Vaclav Milik ¦ 1,871 ¦ 7,57 ¦
 Dawid Stachyra ¦ 0,944 ¦ 3,00 ¦
 Lewis Bridger ¦ 1,535 ¦ 6,78 ¦
 Michal Szczepaniak ¦ 1,750 ¦ 7,50 ¦
 Oskar Polis ¦ 1,381 ¦ 4,17 ¦
 Kamil Adamczewski ¦ 0,333 ¦ 1,00 ¦
Under-21 juniors: (Average points per: ¦ heat ¦ meeting ¦)
 Marcin Bubel ¦ 0,727 ¦ 1,50 ¦
 Robert Chmiel
 Michal Schmidt
 Kamil Wieczorek ¦ 1,000 ¦ 2,33 ¦
 Kacper Woryna ¦ 1,915 ¦ 7,07 ¦
Team Manager:
 Jan Grabowski

2015 Squad

Seniors:
 Rafal Szombierski
 Damian Balinski
 Troy Batchelor
 Dakota North
 Ilja Czalov
 Max Fricke
 Valentin Grobauer
 Chris Harris
 Sebastian Ulamek
Under-21 juniors:
 Robert Chmiel
 Michal Schmidt
 Kamil Wieczorek
 Kacper Woryna
Team Manager:
 Jan Grabowski

2016 Squad

Seniors:
 Rafal Szombierski
 Damian Balinski
  Rune Holta
 Dakota North
 Grigory Laguta
 Max Fricke
 Andreas Jonsson
 Troy Batchelor
 Roman Chromik
 Ilja Czalov
Under-21 juniors:
 Robert Chmiel
 Michal Schmidt
 Kamil Wieczorek
 Kacper Woryna
Team Manager:
 Piotr Zyto

2017 Squad

Seniors:
 Jake Allen
 Rafal Szombierski
 Damian Balinski
 Tobiasz Musielak
 Grigory Laguta
 Max Fricke
 Fredrik Lindgren
Under-21 juniors:
 Robert Chmiel
 Lars Skupien
 Kacper Woryna
Team Manager:
 Miroslaw Korbel

2018 Squad

Seniors:
 Troy Batchelor
 Craig Cook
 Artur Czaja
 Andriej Karpow
 Mateusz Szczepaniak
 Kacper Woryna
Under-21 juniors:
 Robert Chmiel
 Przemyslaw Giera
 Dawid Jona
 Lars Skupien
 Mateusz Tudziez
 Milosz Wypior
Team Manager:
 Piotr Zyto

2019 Squad

Seniors:
 Troy Batchelor
 Daniel Bewley
 Jye Etheridge
 Nick Morris
 Sergey Logachev
 Linus Sundstroem
 Mateusz Szczepaniak
 Zbigniew Suchecki
 Kacper Woryna
Under-21 juniors:
 Robert Chmiel
 Kacper Duda
 Przemyslaw Giera
 Dawid Jona
 Kacper Klosok
 Mateusz Tudziez
 Dominik Tyman
Team Manager:
 Piotr Zyto

2020 Squad

Seniors: (Average points per: ¦ heat ¦ meeting ¦)
 Troy Batchelor ¦ 0,625 ¦ 1,25 ¦
 Greg Hancock (sign contract on 15.11.2019, but retired on 15.02.2020 before start of the season in Poland)
 Robert Lambert ¦ 1,838 ¦ 10,14 ¦
 Andžejs Lebedevs ¦ 1,400 ¦ 3,67 ¦
 Sergey Logachev ¦ 1,465 ¦ 5,40 ¦
 Vaclav Milik ¦ 1,226 ¦ 5,38 ¦
 Mateusz Szczepaniak ¦ 1,207 ¦ 3,10 ¦
 Kacper Woryna ¦ 1,514 ¦ 7,21 ¦
 Adrian Miedziński (as a guest) ¦ 1,241 ¦ 4,13 ¦
Under-21 juniors:
 Kacper Duda
 Przemyslaw Giera
 Kacper Klosok ¦ 0,000 ¦ 0,00 ¦
 Mateusz Tudziez ¦ 0,564 ¦ 1,21 ¦
 Dominik Tyman
 Blazej Wypior
 Kamil Nowacki (loaned on 22.06.2020) ¦ 0,614 ¦ 1,92 ¦
Team Manager:
 Piotr Swiderski (announced on 4.11.2019, but resigned before start of the season on 17.02.2020)
 Lech Kędziora (announced on 28.02.2020)

2021 Squad

Seniors:
 Rune Holta
 Kacper Gomólski
 Michael Jepsen Jensen
 Sergey Logachev
 Pontus Aspgren
Under-24:
 Viktor Trofimov jr.
 Leon Flint
Under-21 juniors:
 Przemyslaw Giera
 Mateusz Tudziez
 Paweł Trześniewski
 Blazej Wypior
Team Manager:
 Marek Cieślak

2022 Squad

Seniors:
 Grzegorz Zengota
 Krystian Pieszczek
 Andreas Lyager 
 Nicolai Klindt loan from KM Ostrów Wielkopolski on 26.04.2022
 Sergey Logachev suspended by Polish Automobile and Motorcycle Federation
 Patryk Wojdyło
 Kacper Tkocz
 Paweł Trześniewski
 Lech Chlebowski
Under 24:
 Leon Flint
Under-21 juniors:
 Seweryn Grabarczyk
 Szymon Tomaszewski
Team Manager:
 Antoni Skupień

Notable riders

Honours

References

Polish speedway teams
Rybnik
Sport in Silesian Voivodeship